Vibras (English: Vibes) is the third studio album by Colombian reggaeton singer J Balvin released on 25 May 2018 through Universal Latin. The album was promoted with five singles, including the international hit, "Mi Gente", which was released as the lead single of the album.

Development 

In June 2017, Balvin together with French producer and DJ Willy William released the single, "Mi Gente". The song became a major commercial success reaching number one in over thirty countries worldwide, including number three on the US Billboard Hot 100 chart; it stayed on the chart for 35 consecutive weeks. According to Balvin he developed the concept for the album from the moment "Mi Gente" started "connecting with audiences around the world", wanting to make a fusion of different world beats and rhythms and refine the reggaeton music.

In an interview with Ebro Darden for Beats 1 Radio on Apple Music in April 2018, Balvin described the sound of the record as 33% dancehall, 33% R&B, and 33% reggaeton. Balvin further elaborated that a lot of love was put into the album's work and that contains different vibes, hence the name, Vibras, "The real meaning of this album was what's going on with Spanish music that's going so global, the fact that we did an album that the beats are so amazing that you don't have to understand what we say, you just have to love the songs."

Talking to NBC News Balvin explained how the core of the album is still the reggaeton, but according to him you can present the genre "in a way that people that don't know reggaeton or don't understand it, they would feel great." The singer further elaborated that he went back to his roots, but also "added some extra spice to it". Apart of William, the album features multiple other collaborators including the reggaeton duos Wisin & Yandel and Zion & Lennox, Brazilian singer Anitta, Mexican indie-pop musician Carla Morrison, flamenco singer Rosalía and Aruban singer Jeon.

Critical reception 

Vibras received generally favorable reviews from music critics. At Metacritic, which assigns a normalized rating out of 100 to reviews from mainstream critics, the album received an average score of 80 based on 4 reviews. Thom Jurek of AllMusic described Vibras as Balvin's attempt to reach English-speaking audience without singing in English. He wrote that the singer's ambition on the record is "grand" and further called it more "consistent" and "varied" than his previous album, Energia (2016), "its songwriting, performances, and production are truly inspired, making for an utterly compelling listen and one of the essential soundtracks of summer." Juana Giaimo of The Guardian gave the album four out of five stars commending its production, lyrics and Balvin's vocals. She also praised the sound of the reggaeton music on the album calling it "smooth" and "sensual", "tracks such as this still make Vibras perfect as a party playlist, but confirm that the noisy style of early reggaeton hits such as Daddy Yankee's 'Gasolina' is slowly being left behind." Rolling Stones Will Hermes stated that Vibras "happens to be a pan-Latin masterstroke of its own, a set of primo Spanish-language pop with vibe deep enough to make it universal."

Raisa Bruner of Time magazine named Vibras the fifth best album of 2018, writing "[J Balvin] has carved out a space in mainstream music on his own terms; he makes no concessions for English speakers, instead serving up a colorful tour of Latin America's hottest musical trends." Billboard ranked it at number nine on their year-end list.

Commercial performance 
Vibras achieved the highest first-week streams for a Latin album on Apple Music globally, replacing Romeo Santos' 2017 album Golden. It also claimed the record for the most-streamed Latin album in 24 hours on the streaming platform for 2018. In the United States, it debuted at number one on the Top Latin Albums chart for the issue dated 9 June 2018. According to Nielsen Music, the record sold 22,000 album-equivalent units and became Balvin's second number-one album on the chart, following Energia in 2016. Out of the starting sum, 10,000 were in traditional album sales, which marked the second largest sales week of 2018, behind only CNCO's self-titled album that sold 13,000 copies. Additionally, Vibras scored the largest streaming week ever for a Latin album by an artist; its songs were streamed 16.1 million times. Subsequently, it debuted at number 15 on the US Billboard 200 and became his highest-charting album on the chart.

Promotion 

To further promote the album, Balvin began The Vibras Tour in Mexico City, Mexico on 26 May 2018.

Track listing

Personnel 
Credits adapted from AllMusic and Tidal.

Performance

J Balvin – vocals
Anitta – vocals
Jeon – vocals
Lennox	– vocals
Wisin – vocals
Yandel – vocals
Zion – vocals
Rosalía – vocals
Carla Morrison – vocals
Willy William – vocals

Technical

ChildsPlay – production
DJ Chuckie – production
Marcos "Tainy" Masis – production
Luis Miguel Pardo – production
Alejandro "Sky" Ramírez – production
Chris Jeday – production
Willy William – vocals production
Hunter Jackson	– assistance
Antonio “Dj Fuse” Olivera – Recording
Phil Greiss – mixing
Josh Gudwin – mixing
Dave Kutch – mastering

Miscellaneous

Orli Arias – photography
Luis Bañuelos – design
Oscar Botello – creative direction, design
Kris Buhidar – design

Charts

Weekly charts

Year-end charts

Certifications

Release history

References 

2018 albums
J Balvin albums
Spanish-language albums
Latin Grammy Award for Best Urban Music Album
Albums produced by Sky Rompiendo
Albums produced by Tainy